Catherine Doherty is a camogie player and a purchaser, who played in the 2009 All Ireland camogie final. She played corner-forward on her first All Ireland final appearance in 2001. and her brother, Noel, who won an All-Ireland Intermediate medal in 2008. Another brother, Niall, has also donned the county colours in various grades while an uncle, Joe Doherty, played Senior with Kilkenny in 1965. Catherine won a Purcell Cup medal with Carlow I.T. and was picked on the combined Purcell team in 2005. She played camogie/shinty for Ireland in Centenary Year and represented Leinster in the Gael Linn in 2000, 2002, 2005, and 2009. Has won a National League and Leinster Junior and Senior titles with Kilkenny, as well as Junior and Intermediate medals with the club. Her senior debut was in 2000.
.

References

External links 
 Official Camogie Website
 Kilkenny Camogie Website
 Review of 2009 championship in On The Ball Official Camogie Magazine
 https://web.archive.org/web/20091228032101/http://www.rte.ie/sport/gaa/championship/gaa_fixtures_camogie_oduffycup.html Fixtures and results] for the 2009 O'Duffy Cup
 All-Ireland Senior Camogie Championship: Roll of Honour
 Video highlights of 2009 championship Part One and part two
 Video Highlights of 2009 All Ireland Senior Final
 Report of All Ireland final in Irish Times Independent and Examiner

1981 births
Living people
Kilkenny camogie players